Mark Leonard Winter is an Australian actor, known for performances in film, television and on stage.

Early life
Winter's family moved from Australia to Washington DC, United States, when he was in grade ten. It was the freedom of his American school and new friends, that he credits with passion for the arts and creative thinking. He states that he started to think a bit too creatively, so his parents sent him back to Australia to attend boarding school where he fell in love with English literature and theatre.

Winter spent a year studying at Flinders University in Adelaide, South Australia, and then went on to study acting at Victorian College of Arts.

Career
His screen roles include Balibo (2009), Blame (2010), Dangerous Remedy (2012), Healing (2014), One Eyed Girl (2015), The Dressmaker alongside Kate Winslet, and Little Tornadoes (2020). Winter starred in the 2020 thriller film Escape from Pretoria, which was filmed in Adelaide in March 2019.

On stage, he has performed major roles with leading Australian theatre companies, including the Sydney Theatre Company and the Melbourne Theatre Company. Winter is one of the founding members of Black Lung, an independent theatre company. In 2015, Winter starred in the Melbourne Theatre Company's production of Simon Stephens' Birdland. for which he won Best Male Actor at the Helpmann Awards.

Winter directed Jason Alexander in an American production of The Blind Date Project, which he helped to devise.

In the TV series Pine Gap (2018) he played a technical geek on the autism spectrum, Moses Dreyfus. Winter was nominated for an AACTA Award for his performance in 2020's TV mini-series, Halifax: Retribution. Following that, Winter played Callum on the TV mini-series Inside, then Russell in the TV series The Newsreader in 2021. In 2021 he also played Joel Welch, a methadone addict in episode 3 of the ABC TV series Fires.

Recognition

 2017 Sidney Myer Creative Fellowship: Recognising Outstanding Talent for mid-career artists
 2017 Green Room Award Nomination: Best Male Actor for Miss Julie (Melbourne Theatre Company)
 2016 Helpmann Award Winner: Best Male Actor for Birdland (Melbourne Theatre Company)
 2016 Helpmann Award Winner: Best Male Supporting Actor for King Lear (Sydney Theatre Company)
 2015 Green Room Award Nomination: Best Male Actor for Birdland (Melbourne Theatre Company)
 2015 Madrid International Film Festival Award Nomination: Best Lead Actor for One Eyed Girl (Projector Films)
 2014 21st Annual Austin Film Festival: Dark Matters, Jury Award for One Eyed Girl (Projector Films)
 2012 Sydney Theatre Awards Nomination: Best Leading Actor for Thyestes (Belvoir Street Theatre)
 2012 Sydney Theatre Awards Nomination: Best New Australian Work for Thyestes (Belvoir Street Theatre)
 2010 Green Room Awards Nomination: Best Actor for Thyestes (Malthouse Theatre)
 2010 Green Room Awards Winner: Best Production, Best Adaption, Best Ensemble for Thyestes (Malthouse Theatre)
 2009 Green Room Award Nomination: Best Show for 3 x Sisters (The Hayloft Project)

Other

In November 2018, Winter gave evidence against his co-star in King Lear, Geoffrey Rush, in Rush's defamation lawsuit against the Daily Telegraph.

Winter is married to actress and singer, Geraldine Hakewill; they first met in 2011, occasionally crossing paths until they became a couple in 2017, and married in December 2021. They have co-starred in the 2020 psychodrama Disclosure.

Winter is a big fan of movies from the 1970s, and loves the work of Robert De Niro and Daniel Day-Lewis.

References

External links
 

21st-century Australian male actors
Helpmann Award winners
Living people
Year of birth missing (living people)
Australian male film actors
Australian male stage actors
Australian film directors
Australian male television actors